Extinct Instinct is the third studio album by British progressive metal band Threshold, released in 1997. It is the first album to feature drummer Mark Heaney and the second to feature vocalist Damian Wilson, his first album with the band being their 1993 debut, Wounded Land. The album was rereleased in 2004 as a special edition with three bonus tracks; unlike the previous two albums, this edition did not include a multimedia section of any kind.

The songs on the album resume the themes of war and environmentalism found on Wounded Land, and also introduce themes of human self-absorption and isolation. The middle segment of the song "The Whispering" makes extensive direct reference to Wounded Land's opening song, "Consume to Live."

Track listing

Notes 
The song "Part of the Chaos" ends at 8:20. After 30 seconds of silence (8:20 – 8:50), the hidden song "Segue" begins.

Notes 
The 2012 Definitive Edition released by Nuclear Blast includes "Mansion," but replaces the other two tracks with the following:

Special edition features
Extended booklet with slipcase and liner notes
Remastered with three bonus tracks

Personnel
Damian Wilson – vocals
Karl Groom – guitars, backing vocals
Nick Midson – guitars
Jon Jeary – bass, acoustic guitar, backing vocals
Richard West – keyboards, backing vocals
Mark Heaney – drums

References

1997 albums
Threshold (band) albums
Inside Out Music albums
Albums produced by Karl Groom